The twenty-ninth series of the British television drama series Grange Hill began broadcasting on 7 November 2005, before ending on 2 December 2005 on BBC One. The series follows the lives of the staff and pupils of the eponymous school, an inner-city London comprehensive school. It consists of twenty episodes.

Cast

Pupils

Teachers

Others

Episodes

DVD release
The twenty-ninth series of Grange Hill has never been released on DVD as of 2014.

Notes

References

2005 British television seasons
Grange Hill